Merna is an unincorporated community in McLean County, Illinois, United States. Merna formerly had a post office with ZIP code 61758, which was closed in the mid 2000s .

Notable person
 George J. Mecherle, founder of State Farm Insurance

References

External links
Merna once a center of Irish Catholic life - Pantagraph (Bloomington, Illinois newspaper)

Unincorporated communities in McLean County, Illinois
Unincorporated communities in Illinois